Graham is a census-designated place (CDP) in Pierce County, Washington, United States. It is located 16 miles southeast of Tacoma. The population was 23,491 at the 2010 census and grew to 32,658 at the 2020 census.

Geography
According to the United States Census Bureau, the CDP has a total area of 21.4 square miles (55.5 km2), all of it land.

Demographics

As of the census of 2000, there were 8,739 people, 2,989 households, and 2,427 families residing in the CDP. The population density was 407.9 people per square mile (157.5/km2). There were 3,120 housing units at an average density of 145.6/sq mi (56.2/km2). The racial makeup of the CDP was 90.15% White, 1.28% African American, 1.28% Native American, 1.80% Asian, 0.50% Pacific Islander, 0.98% from other races, and 4.01% from two or more races. Hispanic or Latino of any race were 2.81% of the population.

There were 2,989 households, out of which 42.5% had children under the age of 18 living with them, 68.8% were married couples living together, 7.7% had a female householder with no husband present, and 18.8% were non-families. 14.3% of all households were made up of individuals, and 3.7% had someone living alone who was 65 years of age or older. The average household size was 2.92 and the average family size was 3.20.

In the CDP, the population was spread out, with 30.3% under the age of 18, 6.7% from 18 to 24, 32.5% from 25 to 44, 24.1% from 45 to 64, and 6.4% who were 65 years of age or older. The median age was 35 years. For every 100 females, there were 101.0 males. For every 100 females age 18 and over, there were 98.9 males.

The median income for a household in the CDP was $52,824, and the median income for a family was $55,800. Males had a median income of $45,348 versus $25,802 for females. The per capita income for the CDP was $21,126. About 4.4% of families and 7.6% of the population were below the poverty line, including 9.4% of those under age 18 and 8.3% of those age 65 or over.

Library
 Pierce County Library System, Graham Branch

Education
Bethel School District includes most of Graham. Some parts of northeast Graham are in the Orting School District, and small portions of Graham to the north are in the Puyallup School District.

Schools in or near Graham include:
 Elementary Schools:
 Centennial Elementary School
 Graham Elementary School
 Kapowsin Elementary School
 Nelson Elementary School
 North Star Elementary School
 Rocky Ridge Elementary School
 Middle Schools:
 Cougar Mountain Middle School
 Frontier Middle School
 Liberty Middle School
 High School:
 Graham-Kapowsin High School
 Bethel High School
 Private school:
 Bethel Baptist Christian School (grades K4-12)
 Nearby colleges:
 Pacific Lutheran University (Parkland)
 Colleges in Tacoma
 Colleges in Lakewood
 Colleges in Puyallup
 Colleges offering classes at Joint Base Lewis-McChord''

Events
The annual Pierce County Fair & Highland Games are held in Graham at Frontier Park.

Surrounding communities

References

External links

 The Dispatch, Local Newspaper:Serving Eatonville, Ashford, Elbe, Roy and Graham.
 Graham Business Association
 Graham Fire & Rescue

Census-designated places in Pierce County, Washington
Census-designated places in Washington (state)